Integrin alphaXbeta2 (p150,95, CR4) is a complement receptor composed of CD11c and CD18.

External links
 
 

Immune system
Integrins